The 2015 BYU Cougars softball team represented Brigham Young University in the 2015 NCAA Division I softball season.  Gordon Eakin entered the year as head coach of the Cougars for a 13th consecutive season. 2015 was the second season for the Cougars as members of the WCC in softball. The Cougars entered 2015 having won their last 6 conference championships and as the favorites in the WCC. After sweeping a double header from Santa Clara on May 1, BYU won the 2015 WCC regular season title and became the first team to clinch a spot in the 2015 NCAA Division I softball tournament. The berth would be BYU's eleventh consecutive berth in the NCAA tournament.

BYU played in the Eugene, Oregon softball region where they went 1–2, losing to North Dakota State in the second elimination game. The Cougars finished the season 40–14, 13–2 in conference play. During the process McKenna Bull set a record for number of wins within a season at BYU with 34.

2015 roster

Schedule 

|-
!colspan=10 style="background:#002654; color:#FFFFFF;"| Kajikawa Classic

 

|-
!colspan=10 style="background:#002654; color:#FFFFFF;"| Wilson/DeMari Desert Classic

|-
!colspan=10 style="background:#002654; color:#FFFFFF;"| Mary Nutter Collegiate Classic

|-
!colspan=10 style="background:#002654; color:#FFFFFF;"| Puerto Vallarta College Challenge

|-
!colspan=10 style="background:#002654; color:#FFFFFF;"| University of Tennessee Tournament 

|-
!colspan=10 style="background:#002654; color:#FFFFFF;"| San Diego Classic II

|-
!colspan=10 style="background:#002654; color:#FFFFFF;"| Regular season

|-
!colspan=10 style="background:#002654;"| 2015 NCAA Regionals

TV, radio, and streaming information
During the 2015 season BYUtv broadcast 13 home games:  Mar. 20 (DH) & 21 vs. Oklahoma State, Mar. 21 vs. Utah Valley, Apr. 10 (DH) & 11 vs. Pacific, Apr. 16 (DH) vs. Southern Utah, Apr. 22 vs. Utah State, Apr. 25 vs. San Diego, Apr. 28 vs. Weber State, and May 5 vs. Utah Valley. Spencer Linton acted as the play-by-play man for these games while former Cougar softball coach Vaughn Alvey and former football and baseball player Gary Sheide provided the analysis. 

TheW.tv streamed 2 home games: Apr. 24 (DH) vs. San Diego. Robbie Bullough provided play-by-play and Bailey Higgins provided analysis. The second game would be suspended, and TheW.tv was not able to pick up the remainder of the second game on Apr. 25.

BYU Radio would provide a game broadcast for two road games during the season. The Mar. 31 game at Utah State and the Apr. 7 game at Utah Valley would have a radio only broadcast with Robbie Bullough providing the call. BYU Radio would also simulcast 7 BYUtv games.

Road games at UNLV (MW Network), at Weber State (Watch Big Sky), at Utah State (MW Network), at Utah Valley (YouTube), and the first game at Loyola Marymount (The W.tv) would have Internet TV broadcasts available.

External links 
 BYU Softball at byucougars.com

References 

2015 team
2015 in sports in Utah
2015 West Coast Conference softball season
2015 NCAA Division I softball tournament participants